Luti people, also known as Tushmal are a group of people in southwestern Lorestan and adjacent parts of Chaharmahal and Bakhtiari Province in Iran. Luti people are considered outcasts, polluted and inferior by the general society and no numbers exist on their population. They speak Luri as first language but formerly spoke a distinct language called Darvishi or Lutiyuna which some Luti people have partially retained. It is unclear whether the Luti are related to Romanis.

Etymology 
The etymology of the word 'Luti' is unclear, since it has had various meanings throughout history. The term was first used by 10th-century poet Kesa'i who equated the word to catamite. Rumi and Ubayd Zakani related the word to pederasty in the 13th- and 14th century, while Nasir Khusraw equated 'Luti' to "drinkers, thieves and whore-mongers". Moreover, Suzani Samarqandi warned that they could not be trusted in commercial affairs. In the 16th century, the term was also used to refer to a group of destitute dervishes and dervish-like entertainers who used intoxicating substances. The term would later in the 19th century refer to Robin Hood-types of bandits.

History 
Luti people have only briefly been mentioned in historical texts. Anthropologist Sekandar stated in his 1975 oeuvre that no anthropological study had been done on the Luti and therefore had to conduct anthropological research himself.

During the 1953 Iranian coup d'état, the Luti were used to organize demonstrations, including the protest that led to the fall of Mohammad Mosaddegh. They were used again in protests in 1963 against the reforms of Shah Mohammad Reza Pahlavi. In the 1970s, both the Shah and his opposition approached the Luti for support. After the Iranian Revolution in 1979, many of the Luti joined the ranks of Basij.

See also 

 Javānmardi

Bibliography

Notes

Further reading 

 

History of Lorestan Province
History of Iran
Romani in Iran
Ethnic groups in Iran